Herthania is a genus of marsh beetles in the family Scirtidae. There are at least four described species in Herthania.

Species
These four species belong to the genus Herthania:
 Herthania cherokee Zwick, 2010
 Herthania compta (Klausnitzer, 1976)
 Herthania concinna (LeConte, 1853)
 Herthania confinis (Klausnitzer, 1976)

References

Further reading

 
 

Scirtoidea
Articles created by Qbugbot